The 1899–1900 Burnley F.C. season was the 18th season in the history of Burnley Football Club and their 12th in the Football League.

Football League

Match results

Final league position

FA Cup

References

Burnley F.C. seasons
Burnley